Debi Austin (April 13, 1950 – February 22, 2013) was a pioneering anti-smoking advocate, appearing in anti-tobacco ads that aired in California starting in 1996.

Early life and education
Born Deborah Austin on April 13, 1950, in Illinois, she moved to Los Angeles in 1954. She began smoking while attending junior high school in Canoga Park. Her first cigarette was an unfiltered Camel that she had stolen from her father. By high school she was smoking one pack of Camels per day. By the time she went to UC Berkeley and managed a small, private phone company, she was smoking more than one pack a day.

Cancer diagnosis and commercial 

In 1992, she was diagnosed with laryngeal cancer and had a laryngectomy. She starred in the well-known "Voicebox" ad, where she is talking to the viewer then smokes through her stoma at her throat, described in a statement by Dr. Ron Chapman of the California Department of Public Health as "the most-recognized and talked about California tobacco control ad." He continued, "Debi was a pioneer in the fight against tobacco and showed tremendous courage by sharing her story to educate Californians on the dangers of smoking."

Although she was finally able to quit smoking  after the ads first aired, she continued to battle various forms of cancer for the rest of her life.

Death 
Austin died on February 22, 2013, in Van Nuys, California, aged 62.

See also
Terrie Hall, another anti-tobacco activist who also died in 2013.
Gruen Von Behrens, activist who died in 2015.

References

1950 births
2013 deaths
Deaths from cancer in California
Deaths from laryngeal cancer
Smoking in the United States
Anti-smoking activists
American health activists